Ghidra (pronounced gee-druh) is a free and open source reverse engineering tool developed by the National Security Agency (NSA) of the United States. The binaries were released at RSA Conference in March 2019; the sources were published one month later on GitHub. Ghidra is seen by many security researchers as a competitor to IDA Pro. The software is written in Java using the Swing framework for the GUI. The decompiler component is written in C++, and is therefore usable in a stand-alone form.

Scripts to perform automated analysis with Ghidra can be written in Java or Python (via Jython), though this feature is extensible and support for other programming languages is available via community plugins. Plugins adding new features to Ghidra itself can be developed using a Java-based extension framework.

History
Ghidra's existence was originally revealed to the public via WikiLeaks in March 2017, but the software itself remained unavailable until its declassification and official release two years later.

In June 2019, Coreboot began to use Ghidra for its reverse engineering efforts on firmware-specific problems following the open source release of the Ghidra software suite.

Ghidra can be used, officially, as a debugger since Ghidra 10.0. Ghidra's debugger supports debugging user-mode Windows programs via WinDbg, and Linux programs via GDB.

Supported architectures

The following architectures or binary formats are supported:

 x86 16, 32 and 64 bit
 ARM and AARCH64
 PowerPC 32/64 and VLE
 MIPS 16/32/64
 MicroMIPS
 68xxx
 Java and DEX bytecode
 PA-RISC
 PIC 12/16/17/18/24
 SPARC 32/64
 CR16C
 Z80
 6502
 8048, 8051
 MSP430
 AVR8, AVR32
 SuperH
 V850

See also 
 IDA Pro
 JEB decompiler
 radare2
 Binary Ninja

References

External links 
 
 

Disassemblers
National Security Agency
Free software programmed in C++
Free software programmed in Java (programming language)